Mar Emmanuel Giles Pothanamuzhi, C. M. I. (5 August 1932 – 6 April 2003) was a Syro-Malabar bishop.

He was born in Nadukkara, near Muvattupuzha, India. He was ordained as a priest in the Carmelites of Mary Immaculate in 1964. A botanist who lectured at Sacred Heart College, Ernakulam, he was the founder principal of Christ College, Bangalore (1969-1983) and rector of the CMI major seminary, Dharmaram College, Bangalore (1990-1996).

He was appointed as Bishop of Mananthavady (Syro-Malabar) in 1997.

References
 Dharmaram College, Bangalore
 Diocese of Mananthavady
 Obituary

1932 births
2003 deaths
20th-century Eastern Catholic bishops
21st-century Eastern Catholic bishops
Syro-Malabar Catholics
Archdiocese of Ernakulam-Angamaly
Christian clergy from Kochi